The Smithsonian American Women's History Museum is a future Smithsonian Institution museum dedicated to women's history, to be located in Washington, DC. The museum was established by Congress as part of the Consolidated Appropriations Act, 2021, which became law on December 27, 2020. Development of the museum is expected to take at least ten years.

Lisa Sasaki was appointed as the museum's first interim director in March 2021.

In August 2021, the Smithsonian Board of Regents established an advisory council for the planning, design, fundraising, and development of the museum. Founding members of the council include Secretary of the Smithsonian Lonnie Bunch, fashion designer Tory Burch, actress Lynda Carter, and tennis champion Billie Jean King.

References

External links
 

Women's History
Proposed museums in the United States
Women's museums in the United States
Museums established in 2020